The former Japanese Hospital building on the island of Rota in the Northern Mariana Islands is one of the few remaining Japanese-era buildings on the island.  It is a single-story L-shaped concrete structure.  When listed on the National Register of Historic Places in 1981, it was described as being in derelict condition, being little more than the concrete structure, lacking a roof, windows, and most of its woodwork.  The window openings are sheltered by typical Japanese concrete canopies.  The building was built by the Japanese about 1930, during the South Seas Mandate period; most Japanese-built structures on Rota were destroyed during World War II.

See also
National Register of Historic Places listings in the Northern Mariana Islands

References

Buildings and structures on the National Register of Historic Places in the Northern Mariana Islands
Hospital buildings completed in 1930
Rota (island)
Hospital buildings on the National Register of Historic Places
1930s establishments in the Northern Mariana Islands
Health in the Northern Mariana Islands